Jefferson County Courthouse Complex is a courthouse complex and national historic district located at Watertown in Jefferson County, New York.  The district includes three contributing buildings; the courthouse building (1862), Clerk's Office (1883–1884) and Surrogate's Office (1905). The courthouse building is a two-story, red brick structure with limestone trim.  It features a three-story tower on the northwest corner.  It was designed by architect Horatio Nelson White.

It was listed on the National Register of Historic Places in 1974.

Gallery

References

External links

Courthouses on the National Register of Historic Places in New York (state)
Historic American Buildings Survey in New York (state)
Historic districts on the National Register of Historic Places in New York (state)
County courthouses in New York (state)
1862 establishments in New York (state)
National Register of Historic Places in Watertown, New York